Kaniów  is a village in the administrative district of Gmina Bestwina, within Bielsko County, Silesian Voivodeship, in southern Poland. The village is located in the historical region Galicia.

The village has a population of 2,926.

References

Villages in Bielsko County